Byrd at the Gate is an album by jazz guitarist Charlie Byrd, recorded at The Village Gate in 1963 and released on the Riverside label.

Reception

S. M. Haney of AllMusic wrote, "This is a listening pleasure to the first degree. Unlike any other, Charlie Byrd sincerely knows how to make his instrument speak, sending graceful chords and melodies to this attentive audience... Cheers to the Charlie Byrd Trio for a dynamic effort during this May 1963 gig. Applause, applause." The Penguin Guide to Jazz commented that the addition of a trumpeter and saxophonist to Byrd's normal trio format of the time contributed little.

Track listing
All compositions by Charlie Byrd except as indicated
 "Shiny Stockings" (Frank Foster) - 4:57    
 "More" (Nino Oliviero, Riz Ortolani) - 2:53    
 "Blues for Night People" - 7:07    
 "Butter and Egg Man" (Percy Venable) - 3:40    
 "Ela Me Deixou"  - 3:34    
 "Broadway" (Billy Bird, Teddy McRae, Henri Woode) - 4:42    
 "I Left My Heart in San Francisco" (George Cory, Douglass Cross) - 2:59    
 "Some Other Spring" (Arthur Herzog, Jr., Irene Kitchings) - 4:18    
 "Where Are the Hebrew Children? (Traditional) - 8:20    
 "Let's Do It (Let's Fall in Love)" (Cole Porter) - 4:26 Bonus track on CD reissue    
 "Jive at Five"  (Count Basie, Harry "Sweets" Edison) - 7:11 Bonus track on CD reissue

Personnel 
Charlie Byrd - guitar
Keter Betts - bass
Bill Reichenbach - drums
Clark Terry - flugelhorn, trumpet (tracks 4, 6,  8)
Seldon Powell - tenor saxophone (tracks 2, 4, 5, 8)

References 

1963 live albums
Charlie Byrd live albums
Riverside Records live albums
Albums produced by Orrin Keepnews
Albums recorded at the Village Gate